The Framingham Reservoir No. 2 Dam and Gatehouse is a historic water works facility in Framingham, Massachusetts. The dam and gatehouse are located west of the junction of Winter and Fountain Streets, and impound a branch of the Sudbury River. The reservoir, which is also known as the Brackett Reservoir, was built 1877-79 as part of an expansion of the water supply of the city of Boston. The core of the dam is granite rubble laid in cement, with earthen embankments. The overfall area is faced on the downstream side with cut granite, and earthen embankment on the upstream side. It is topped with granite and originally had iron mounts for flashboards. The gatehouse is a rectangular granite structure with a steep hip roof, a brick chimney and an eyebrow dormer. The door and windows are in round-arch openings. It contains gate controls for regulating water flow from the reservoir and from a  pipe connected to Reservoir No. 1, and a  pipe connected to the Ashland Reservoir.

The dam was built by contractors from upstate New York, and the gatehouse was built by James Fagin of Boston to a design by the Boston city architect, George Clough.  The Metropolitan Water Board, established in 1895 to oversee the city's water supply, took the reservoir out of service soon afterward due to its poor water quality.

The dam and gatehouse were listed on the National Register of Historic Places in 1990.

See also
Framingham Reservoir No. 1 Dam and Gatehouse
Framingham Reservoir No. 3 Dam and Gatehouse
Sudbury Aqueduct
National Register of Historic Places listings in Framingham, Massachusetts

References

Dams on the National Register of Historic Places in Massachusetts
Gatehouses (waterworks)
Reservoirs in Massachusetts
Buildings and structures in Framingham, Massachusetts
National Register of Historic Places in Middlesex County, Massachusetts
Dams in Massachusetts
Buildings and structures on the National Register of Historic Places in Massachusetts
Buildings and structures on the National Register of Historic Places
1877 establishments in Massachusetts